Ala di Stura (Piedmontese and Franco-Provençal: Ala) is a comune (municipality) in the Metropolitan City of Turin in the Italian region Piedmont, located in one of the Valli di Lanzo about  northwest of Turin.

Ala di Stura borders the following municipalities: Groscavallo, Chialamberto, Ceres, Balme, Mezzenile, and Lemie.

References

External links
 www.comunealadistura.it

Canavese
Cities and towns in Piedmont